The Uruguayan Football Federation ( or ) was a federation of football clubs founded in Uruguay in 1923 which existed alongside the Uruguayan Football Association (AUF) during the amateur era of Uruguayan football. The Federation was created in response to the Uruguayan football schism, which originated with the disaffiliation of AUF Peñarol and Central during the 1922 championship.

National football championships were organized in tandem with the AUF between 1923 and 1925. In 1925, the Uruguayan government intervened to impose a merger between the old AUF and the FUF into a single federation.

Competitions 

The FUF organized tournaments parallel to the AUF in all categories, as listed below; these tournaments are not considered official by the current Uruguayan football governing body, the Uruguayan Football Association (AUF).

Domestic 
 Primera División (1923–25)
 División Intermedia (1923–25)
 División Extra (1923–25)

International 
 Copa Campeonato del Río de la Plata (1923)

Notes

References 

Sports organizations established in 1923
1923 establishments in Uruguay
1925 disestablishments in Uruguay
Football governing bodies in Uruguay